Roger Patrick Martin Quigley (17 March 1969 – 18 August 2020) was an English singer-songwriter from Manchester, England, and one-half of the indie pop duo known as The Montgolfier Brothers.

Roger Quigley was born in Salford and studied fine art at the University of Sunderland.

He released multiple recordings, including two LPs — 1969 Till God Knows When, and Quigley's Point. The latter effort was recorded under the 'At Swim Two Birds' moniker, a name was inspired by At Swim-Two-Birds, a classic tome by the Irish novelist, Flann O'Brien.

Quigley died suddenly on 18 August 2020. An obituary was published two weeks later in the Guardian.

References

External links
Roger Quigley... details on artist (German)
At Swim Two Birds artist's page at Indiepop (Italian)
Quigley artist's page at Acetone Records (French)
Quigley's Point music review (Spanish)

1969 births
2020 deaths
English male singer-songwriters
Musicians from Manchester